Southern Pacific is the debut studio album by the American country music group of the same name. It was released in 1985 via Warner Bros. Records. The album includes the singles "Someone's Gonna Love Me Tonight", "Thing About You", "Perfect Stranger" and "Reno Bound".

Track listing

Chart performance

References

1985 debut albums
Southern Pacific (band) albums
Albums produced by Jim Ed Norman
Warner Records albums